Moscow Radio Centre 13 is a transmission facility near Balashikha, approximately 3.5 km east of the ringbelt motorway of Moscow. Moscow Radio Centre 13 served in the Cold War era as jammer to block transmissions of western shortwave radio programs.
 
Although the radio wave jammer activities ceased in the middle of the 1980s, some occasional continuing of the jammer use occurred on March 14, 1989 to block incoming transmissions to the Lithuanian minority in Moscow area.
 
In later years, a tall, 176 m freestanding lattice tower for transmissions was built in OIRT-band. In 2005, a new mast for FM-broadcasting was built by the Russian company Stako. This mast, called Balashikha Transmission Mast', has a triangular cross section which is 3.6 m in width. The construction originally  planned for the mast to reach a height of 460 m and contain six floors, however the mast has only reached a height of 300 m and is constructed of 4 levels.

In the meantime, shortwave transmission was ceased at Moscow Radio Centre 13. The shortwave broadcasting masts were dismantled between 2002 and 2007.

Standard FM-Band

See also 
 Russian 460 metre radio mast
 List of Russian-language radio stations

External links 
 http://skyscraperpage.com/diagrams/?b41791,69873
 https://web.archive.org/web/20120209175334/http://www.tvtower.ru/311_RCMO/rc13.shtml
 
 Site on Google Maps: Mast was not built, when picture was mase, but smaller tower clearly visible

Towers in Russia
Radio masts and towers in Europe
Radio in the Soviet Union